The  is a large, heavy-duty four wheel drive SUV introduced by Toyota in 1995. The largest 4WD ever built by Toyota, it resembles the Humvee in terms of design. 

Like the Humvee, the Mega Cruiser was originally designed primarily for military use with the vehicle seeing duty as a transport vehicle in the Japan Self Defense Forces (see :ja:高機動車).

Sold exclusively in Japan via Toyota Store locations, the Mega Cruiser was also used by prefectural police, the Japan Auto Federation and fire/rescue departments. As of 2020, it was reported that Toyota had produced 3,000 units before production was halted. A total of 133 Mega Cruisers were sold to civilians.

History
A prototype of the Toyota Mega Cruiser was first presented to the public at the 30th Tokyo Motor Show in October 1993. Production began in late 1995 at Toyota's Gifu Auto Body subsidiary before sales began in 1996.

All Mega Cruiser production was reported to have been halted in 2001 while sales officially ended in 2002. The reason being slow sales due to strict vehicle taxes and Japan having a lot of narrow streets. 

Some Mega Cruisers were sold overseas from Japan as grey imports.

Development
The Mega Cruiser was designed as a 4-door full-size SUV and features a 4.1 L turbo diesel inline-4 engine. A 4-speed Aisin-Warner automatic transmission with a two-speed transfer case transfers power to all four wheels. 

The SUV featured front, center, and rear differential locks, as well as four wheel steering. It has a central tire pressure system installed as an optional feature and has a hardtop roof. The Mega Cruiser has seats for two people in front and four people at the back.

The vehicle was intended to test designs that would eventually make their way into mass-produced Toyota SUVs, such as the Land Cruiser, but was financially unsuccessful for Toyota. 

While the Mega Cruiser was produced by Toyota in RHD configuration, a few were reported to be made in LHD configuration. As of 2020, around 12 were known to have been produced in LHD.

Variants

Mega Cruiser (BXD10)

The BXD10 version was made for military purposes such as personnel and military equipment transportation. In JSDF service it was called , or HMV.

Missile launcher (BXD10)

A modified BXD10 mounting the Type 93 Surface-to-air missile, produced by Toshiba Heavy Industries.

Mega Cruiser (BXD20)

The BXD20 version was made for civilian sales and was available with two roof types, the standard low roof and the optional high roof. Some BXD20 versions also saw service as a military vehicle while others were used by prefectural police/fire departments and the JAF.

References

External links
 
 
 

Mega Cruiser
Full-size sport utility vehicles
All-wheel-drive vehicles
1990s cars
2000s cars
Military light utility vehicles
Post–Cold War military equipment of Japan
Military vehicles of Japan
Expanded length sport utility vehicles